Secondhand Lions is a 2003 American comedy-drama film written and directed by Tim McCanlies. It tells the story of an introverted young boy (Haley Joel Osment) who is sent to live with his eccentric great uncles (Robert Duvall and Michael Caine) on a farm in Texas.

Plot 

Fourteen-year-old Walter is left by his irresponsible mother, Mae, to live for the summer with his reclusive, bachelor great uncles, Hub and Garth. Despite living on a ramshackle Texas farm, they are said to have a secret fortune and are made the target of every traveling salesman. They, in turn, sit on their porch with shotguns, shooting at the salesmen.

Walter is given a room in the attic and is not welcomed by his uncles at first, until they realize he annoys other gold-digging relatives who visit with their children. Walter persuades his uncles to try spending some of their money. Packets of seeds to plant a vegetable garden turn out all to be corn. Then they order a lion for an animal target and end up with an aging, tame, retired circus lioness, which they turn over to Walter as a pet. Later, she is released by accident and takes to the cornfield, which becomes her new "jungle" home. While loading fifty-pound bags of Lion Chow, Hub passes out and is taken to the hospital. After they leave they encounter four local toughs at a roadside store, who draw switchblades on Hub, but he easily beats them in a fight.

A subplot develops around the photograph of a beautiful woman that Walter finds in the attic. In a series of flashbacks, Garth tells Walter the story of their past in the French Foreign Legion, during which Hub fell in love with an Arab princess named Jasmine, who was promised to a powerful sheik. After Hub and Jasmine married, the sheik put a price on Hub's head, keeping them in constant peril from assassins. Finally, Hub won a duel against the sheik, but spared his life, warning him to cease the manhunt. When Walter asks to hear more from Hub, his uncle reveals that Jasmine and their baby died in childbirth. Hub then returned to the French Foreign Legion, until he retired with Garth to their farm, where they are resignedly waiting to die. Walter asks Hub for confirmation, since his mother always lies to him. Hub responds with a piece of his standard advice, that the actual truth is not as important as belief in ideals. Walter then asks Hub to promise to be around to give him the rest of the speech when he's old enough and Hub grudgingly agrees.

Late one evening, Walter trails Garth and discovers that his uncles have a room filled with money underneath the barn. On another night, Walter's mother and her current boyfriend, a supposed "private investigator" named Stan, arrive. While the uncles sleep, Stan and Mae demand that Walter reveal the location of his uncles' fortune, claiming the uncles were actually bank robbers. When Walter chooses to believe in his uncles instead, Stan pins Walter down and beats him. The lion, sensing Walter is in danger, emerges from the cornfield and attacks Stan. Awakened by the ruckus, Hub and Garth find the old lioness has died of heart failure defending her “cub”.

The next day, Walter leaves with his mother. Once on the road, Mae explains that Stan will be staying with them to recuperate, but Walter asks her to "do something that's best for me for once" and abandons her. While Hub and Garth are delighted to see him back, Walter insists changes must be made: His uncles must involve themselves in his education and live carefully, as he wants them to die of old age.

Seventeen years later, Walter is alerted by the sheriff of his uncles' deaths from a failed flying stunt with their biplane. When Walter arrives at the farm, he is given his uncles' will, declaring "The kid gets it all. Just plant us in the damn garden, with the stupid lion." A helicopter bearing the logo "Western Sahara Petroleum" then touches down near the homestead and a man steps out with his young son, explaining that he heard about Hub and Garth's deaths on the radio. He had recognized the names as the two Americans in tales told to him in his youth by his grandfather, "a very wealthy sheik". When the man's young son asks Walter if his uncles really lived, Walter confirms, "Yeah. They really lived."

Cast

 Haley Joel Osment as Walter Caldwell
 Robert Duvall as Hub McCann
 Michael Caine as Garth McCann
 Kyra Sedgwick as Mae Caldwell
 Nicky Katt as Stan
 Josh Lucas as Adult Walter Caldwell
 Michael O'Neill as Ralph
 Deirdre O'Connell as Helen
 Christian Kane as Young Hub
 Daniel Brooks as Sheik's Great-Grandson
 Kevin Haberer as Young Garth
 Eric Balfour as Sheik's grandson
 Emmanuelle Vaugier as Jasmine
 Adam Ozturk as The Sheik
 Adrian Pasdar as Skeet Machine Salesman 
 Mitchel Musso as Boy
 Marc Musso as Boy
 Jennifer Stone as Martha
  Taureg as Jasmine the Lion
 Billy Joe Shaver as Delivery Truck Driver
 Travis Willingham as Hood

Closing credits
Director Tim McCanlies, who was an admirer of cartoonist Berkeley Breathed, wrote requesting work of his to feature in the film. Breathed sent the drawings of a strip called Walter and Jasmine, which is presented as the work of the grown-up Walter, and they also accompany the final credits.

Critical reception
The film has a 60% approval rating from critics on Rotten Tomatoes based on 137 reviews, and the sites consensus reads: "A wholesome but schmaltzy movie."

References

External links
 
 
 

2003 films
2000s coming-of-age comedy-drama films
American coming-of-age comedy-drama films
2000s teen comedy-drama films
American teen comedy-drama films
Films about dysfunctional families
Films about friendship
Films about lions
Films about old age
Films produced by David Kirschner
Films set in 1962
Films set on farms
Films set in Texas
Films shot in Texas
Films scored by Patrick Doyle
Films directed by Tim McCanlies
Films with screenplays by Tim McCanlies
Films set in 1979
New Line Cinema films
2000s English-language films
2000s American films